Fermo Forti (3 February 1839 – 1911) was an Italian painter and sculptor, active mainly in his native Carpi and Modena. He painted sacred, historic, and genre subjects in a Realist style.

Biography
He was born in Cibeno di Carpi in the province of Modena. The father, a house painter, fosters the sons education at the Scuola Elementare Comunale di Disegno of Carpi, where Fermo studies under Claudio Rossi. He painted for the church of Sant'Adriano III Papa, Spilamberto. In 1874, he also painted in the Carpi Cathedral alongside L. Rossi and A. Lugli. He also painted a Purification of the Virgi (1975) for the church of Panzano, Modena; a Sant'Antonio for the former convent of San Rocco, Carpi; as well as terracotta sculptures of the Madonna Assunta (1906) in the Museo Civico of Carpi and I martiri Gorgomiensi (1874) for the Church of San Nicolò, Carpi.

He died in Carpi.

References

1839 births
1911 deaths
19th-century Italian painters
19th-century Italian male artists
20th-century Italian painters
20th-century Italian male artists
Italian male painters
Artists from Modena